The Stars and the Blackness Between Them is an American young adult fiction book by Junauda Petrus. It was released on September 17, 2019 by Dutton Books, and tells the story of two teenage girls who build a relationship, as one acclimates to life in Minneapolis after moving from Trinidad, and the other battles an illness. The Stars and the Blackness Between Them received a Coretta Scott King Honor Award.

In February 2021, Petrus announced that a film adaptation is in development.

Synopsis 
16-year-old Audre lives in Port of Spain, Trinidad. At the urging of her mother, she attends church, but forms a romantic relationship with the pastor's granddaughter, Neri. After they are caught engaging in sexual activity, Audre is sent to live with her father in Minneapolis, where she meets Mabel. Mabel is questioning her own sexuality, and the two become friends. As they prepare for the upcoming school year, Mabel finds out she has a life-threatening illness. Audre supports Mabel as she undergoes treatment, both emotionally and through healing practices she has learned from her grandmother.

Publication 
2019, United States, Dutton Books, 17 September 2019, Hardback.

Critical reception 
The book received positive critical reception. Kirkus Reviews described The Stars and the Blackness Between Them in a starred review: "Through a nonlinear storyline and two secondary characters, Afua and Queenie, the author beautifully interjects elements of magical realism while delving into the complexities of spirituality. Readers seeking a deep, uplifting love story will not be disappointed as the novel covers both flourishing feelings and bigger questions around belief and what happens when we face our own mortality." In a second starred review Publishers Weekly wrote, "Petrus’s earnest debut successfully, touchingly combines elements of fantasy, bittersweet realism, and potent, affecting spirituality to tell the coming-of-age story of two complex, beautifully drawn young black women whose friendship and love draw them together even as Mabel’s failing health pushes them apart."

Acccolades 
2019 - Kirkus Reviews - 2019 Best Book
2020 - Coretta Scott King Book Award
2020 - American Library Association - Top Ten Best Fiction for Young Adults Book

References

External links 
The Stars and the Blackness Between Them on Penguin Random House

2019 American novels
2019 LGBT-related literary works
American young adult novels
LGBT-related young adult novels
Novels set in Trinidad and Tobago
Novels set in Minneapolis
2019 debut novels
Magic realism novels
Nonlinear narrative novels
2010s LGBT novels
Literature by African-American women
African-American young adult novels
E. P. Dutton books